Army General Yury Nikolayevich Baluyevsky (born 9 January 1947 at Truskavets in the Ukrainian SSR) is the former First Deputy Minister of Defense and Chief of the General Staff of the Armed Forces of the Russian Federation, positions he held from July 2004 to 2007.

Biography
In 1970, he graduated from the Leningrad joint-arms command college, in 1980, from the M. V. Frunze Military Academy and in 1990, from the General Staff Academy. From 1970 to 1982, Baluyevsky served with the Soviet Army's Ground Forces, advancing from commander of a motorized rifle platoon to senior officer of a military district operations department. He spent some time with the Group of Soviet Forces in Germany.

From 1982 to 1997, Baluyevsky held positions at the General Staff, the Defense Ministry and in the Group of Russian Forces of the Transcaucasus. In August 1997, he was appointed chief of the General Staff main operations department, and in July 2004, chief of staff of the Armed Forces and first deputy defense minister. Following the controversial tenure of General Anatoly Kvashnin, General Baluyevsky was seen as a lower-profile officer with good strategic planning skills, according to the Jamestown Federation.

Baluyevsky was promoted to General of the Army on 22 February 2005, and by June he was appointed CSTO Chief of Staff, echoing Warsaw Pact practice with Soviet and now Russian CGSs taking mirror positions within the alliance organisations.

On 19 January 2008, Baluyevsky warned that Russia was ready to use force, including pre-emptively and with nuclear weapons, to defend itself against the potential threats from "international terrorism or countries seeking global or regional hegemony."

He is also a member of the Board of Directors of Almaz-Antey since July 2005.

Traditionally thought of as a commanding officer with good strategic planning skills, Baluyevsky expressed strong criticism over some controversial issues in Russia's military policy, including the relocation of the Navy Headquarters from Moscow to St. Petersburg and the role and place of the General Staff in the management of the Russian military. The Chief of General Staff said in a public forum that the move was unnecessary.

On 2 June 2007, Baluyevsky stepped down as Chief of the General Staff, and moved to the position in the Security Council of the Russian Federation. He was succeeded by General of the Army Nikolai Makarov, former Chief of Armaments & Deputy Minister of Defense.

Iran's Nuclear Program 

In explaining Russia's rationale, General Yuri Baluyevsky, the Russian Deputy Chief of Staff said at a press conference in June 2002, "Iran does have nuclear weapons. These are non-strategic nuclear weapons. I mean these are not ICBMs with a range of more than 5,500 kilometers... As for the danger of Iran's attack on the United States, the danger is zero." General Baluyevsky's extraordinary briefing implied that Iran had acquired its fissile material from another source so there was no reason for Russia not to complete the nuclear reactor at Bushehr. He concluded "This co-operation will continue." (The cooperation, aside from nuclear reactors, included the delivery of Russian Kilo-class diesel-powered submarines, MiG-29 fighters, Sukhoi bombers, GLONASS navigation system and satellite-launching assistance).

Honours and awards
 Order of Merit for the Fatherland:
2nd class (3 June 2008) – for services to the state and significant contribution to the defense of the Fatherland
3rd class (30 December 2006) – for outstanding contribution to strengthening the defense capability of the Russian Federation and many years of conscientious service
4th class
 Order of Military Merit
 Order for Service to the Homeland in the Armed Forces of the USSR, 3rd class
 Medal "In Commemoration of the 850th Anniversary of Moscow"
 Jubilee Medal "In Commemoration of the 100th Anniversary since the Birth of Vladimir Il'ich Lenin"
 Medal "Veteran of the Armed Forces of the USSR"
 Jubilee Medal "50 Years of the Armed Forces of the USSR"
 Jubilee Medal "60 Years of the Armed Forces of the USSR"
 Jubilee Medal "70 Years of the Armed Forces of the USSR"
 Medal "For Military Merit" (MOD), 1st class
 Medal "Diligence in carrying out engineering tasks"
 Medal for Bosnia-Kosovo
 Medal for Strengthening Military Cooperation (MoD)
 Medal "200 Years of the Ministry of Defense"
 Meritorious Service, 1st class (previously also 2nd and 3rd classes)
 Order of the Yugoslav Star, 1st class

Sources

Interfax-AVN, Russian Armed Forces chief of staff promoted to army general, MOSCOW, 22 Feb 2005

External links
http://www.jamestown.org/edm/article.php?article_id=2368275
Official Biography from the Russian Federation Ministry of Defense.
http://www.jamestown.org/edm/article.php?article_id=2369943

1947 births
Living people
People from Truskavets
Russian people of Ukrainian descent
Generals of the army (Russia)
Recipients of the Order "For Merit to the Fatherland", 2nd class
Recipients of the Order of Military Merit (Russia)
Frunze Military Academy alumni
Military Academy of the General Staff of the Armed Forces of the Soviet Union alumni
Deputy Defence Ministers of Russia